Meter or metre is a unit of measurement of length in the metric system.

Meter or metre may also refer to :
 Meter, a measuring instrument
Utility meter (disambiguation), such as gas, electricity, etc
Parking meter
 Meter or Cybele, an Anatolian-Aegean mother goddess
 Metre (hymn), the syllable patterns in hymn stanzas
 Metre (music), the regular underlying temporal grid of music
 Metre (poetry), the regular linguistic sound patterns of a verse
 The Meters, a funk band based in New Orleans, Louisiana from the late 1960s until 1977
 The Meters (album)
 Metrae or Metre, an ancient city and bishopric now Çatalca district in European Istanbul

See also 
 Metric (disambiguation)
 Metric dimension (disambiguation)
 :Category:Measuring instruments
 
 

es:Metro (desambiguación)